The 2011–12 LNBP was the 12th season of the Liga Nacional de Baloncesto Profesional, one of the professional basketball leagues of Mexico. It started on August 30, 2011 and ended on February 13, 2012. The league title was won by Halcones Rojos Veracruz, which defeated Toros de Nuevo Laredo in the championship series, 4–1.

Format 
14 teams participate. All the teams played against each other and the standings included all 14 teams with no separation in groups. The first 12 teams qualify for the playoffs. The group playoffs have a first round (best-of-5), a second round (best-of-5), semifinals (best-of-7) and finals (best-of-7).

Teams

Regular season

Standings

Playoffs

Preliminary round 
The team seed is indicated after the team name. The first 4 teams in the standings are automatically qualified for the quarterfinals.

Barreteros de Zacatecas (8) defeat Abejas de Guanajuato (9), 3–2
Soles de Mexicali (5) defeat Panteras de Aguascalientes (12), 3–1
Halcones UV Xalapa (6) defeat Lechugueros de León (11), 3–0
Huracanes de Tampico (7) defeat Correcaminos UAT Victoria (10), 3–2

Playoffs

References

External links 
2011–12 LNBP season on Latinbasket.com

LNBP seasons
2011 in Mexican sports
2012 in Mexican sports
2011–12 in North American basketball